Josh Resnick is an American video game producer.

Education
Resnick received a Bachelor of Arts from Pomona College in 1989 and a Master of Business Administration from the Wharton School of the University of Pennsylvania in 1993.

Career 
Resnick spent four years at Activision. He was the co-founder and president of video game development studio Pandemic Studios, which was bought by Electronic Arts in 2008. In 2012, Resnick and his fiancé Rosie O'Neill co-founded Sugarfina, a luxury candy boutique, with Resnick becoming its chief executive officer.

References

Living people
Wharton School of the University of Pennsylvania alumni
Pomona College alumni
Video game producers
Year of birth missing (living people)
Angel investors